The Impossible Thrill is a studio album by Alpha. It was released on Melankolic in 2001. It includes vocal contributions from Martin Barnard, Wendy Stubbs, and Helen White.

Critical reception
At Metacritic, which assigns a weighted average score out of 100 to reviews from mainstream critics, the album received an average score of 64% based on 7 reviews, indicating "generally favorable reviews".

Aidin Vaziri of Rolling Stone included it on the "Top Albums of 2001" list.

Track listing

Sample
"Blues" by Nino Rota on Almost There

Personnel
Credits adapted from liner notes.

 Corin Dingley – production, arrangement, mixing
 Andy Jenks – production, arrangement, photography
 Helen White – vocals (1, 4, 5, 11)
 Wendy Stubbs – vocals (2, 5, 8, 10)
 Martin Barnard – vocals (3, 6, 9)
 Grant Marshall – vocals (8)
 Sean Cook – harmonica
 Pete Wilde – piano
 Alex Lee – guitar
 Bob Locke – bass guitar
 Naked Voices – choir
 Allison Orbaum – choir arrangement
 Daniel Jones – orchestra arrangement
 Paul Hicks – orchestra engineering
 Chris Clark – orchestra engineering assistance
 Gavin Wright – strings conducting
 John Dent – mastering
 Emma Poole – art supervision
 Elissa Noad – layout
 Stephen Gill – photography
 Donald Milne – photography

Charts

References

External links
 

2001 albums
Alpha (band) albums
Melankolic albums
Virgin Records albums